MH SH 173 or Maharashtra State Highway 173 runs in Shegaon and Sangrampur tehsils of Buldhana of Maharashtra State in India.

It starts from Shegaon and takes a northerly route as Kalkhed - Manasgaon, and crosses the Purna River. It enters Sangrampur tehsil and becomes Khiroda, Warwat Khanderao. It crosses with MH SH 195 at Warwat Bakal and continues north towards Banoda Eklara - Bawanbir, meeting MH SH 194 at Tunki. 

From Tunki a Major District Road MDR 1 goes to Wasali and later to Ambabarwa Wildlife Sanctuary.

The nearest connection to Indian National Highway network is with National Highway 6 at Khamgaon via MH SH 24

References
1. Government of Maharashtra, Public Works Department

See also
 List of State Highways in Maharashtra

State Highways in Maharashtra